María Concepción Alonso Bustillo (born June 29, 1957), better known as María Conchita Alonso, is a singer, actress and former beauty queen.

She has participated in film and television productions, and was nominated for the Independent Spirit Award as Best Leading Actress in 1996 for her role in Caught. As a singer, she has received several gold and platinum records, and has been nominated for three Grammy Awards.

Alonso was the first Latin American actress not born in the United States to star in a musical on Broadway. The musical was Kiss of the Spider Woman at the Broadhurst Theater in 1995.

Early life
María Conchita Alonso was born in Cienfuegos, Cuba, on June 29, 1957, to Ricardo Alonso and Conchita Bustillo. Her family moved to Venezuela when she was five years old, in 1962, after the Cuban Revolution. She had her first experience in show business when she was crowned Miss Teenager World in 1971. She was Miss World/Venezuela in 1975, and became sixth runner-up in the Miss World pageant, won by Puerto Rico's Wilnelia Merced.

Career 
Alonso's first gold album and number one song on the charts was Love Maniac, released in 1979 under the name Ámbar. After that followed her second number-one "The Witch" and soon after "Dangerous Rhythm". For what is considered her best known song, she was asked by Giorgio Moroder to write the lyrics in Spanish and sing "Vamos a Bailar" which he had written for the soundtrack of the film Scarface. The song instantly became a classic among Spanish speakers, despite failing to garner major attention outside of Cuba where it was recorded. Her two albums with Ámbar and her solo debut were recorded in English. Her second album, María Conchita, in 1984, made her an international singing star in the Spanish-speaking market, and garnered her first of three Grammy Award nominations (1985, 1988, 1994).

Alonso made her Hollywood film debut in Moscow on the Hudson (1984) with Robin Williams, and also starred in Touch and Go (1986), Extreme Prejudice (1987), The Running Man (1987), Colors (1988), Vampire's Kiss (1989), Predator 2 (1990) and The House of the Spirits (1993).

In 1995, she became the first Latin-born actresses to star in a Broadway show, playing Aurora in Kiss of the Spider Woman. She later acted in the romantic comedies Chasing Papi (2003) and The Last Guy on Earth (2006).

Alonso was cast to play Lucía, the mother of Gabrielle Solis, on the ABC series Desperate Housewives. The episode aired on February 19, 2006. She was in the Latin version, Amas de Casa Desesperadas, for Univision Network. She was a guest star in the live-action film of the comic book El Muerto and appeared in the film Material Girls (2006).

Alonso hosted VH1's ¡Viva Hollywood! on April 13, 2008, with Carlos Ponce. She portrayed Sam in the werewolf horror film Wolf Moon, directed by Dana Mennie.

Alonso appeared in Rob Zombie's The Lords of Salem, released in 2013. Her latest film, a fantasy short titled The Secret of Joy, features her alongside fellow Venezuelan actor Carlos Antonio León, Spanish actress Laura Bayonas, and Brazilian actress Ana Carolina Da Fonseca in a story that aims to bring awareness about pediatric cancer.

Political views 
Alonso has often spoken in support of LGBT rights and in appreciation of her LGBT fans, stating, "I was very much supported by the community when I first came out with my music". In a 2004 article, she compared herself to Cher in terms of her connection to LGBT culture.

Alonso was an outspoken critic of Cuba's Fidel Castro and Venezuelan President Hugo Chávez, whom she described as a "dictator"-like "Hitler" and whose voters and supporters she described as "terrorists." She appeared on Sean Hannity's Hannity's America on May 6, 2007, Hannity & Colmes on June 1, 2007 and Bill O'Reilly's The O'Reilly Factor on August 13, 2007, and March 11, 2009.

Alonso issued an "Open Letter to Sean Penn" online on March 29, 2010 regarding his support of Hugo Chávez. She used a point-by-point refrain of "WHY" in her letter questioning various issues occurring in Venezuela. In December 2011, she got into a heated exchange with Penn at a Los Angeles airport during which Penn called her a pig and she responded by calling Penn a communist (the two had played lovers in the 1988 movie Colors).

In the fall of 2008, Alonso endorsed the presidential campaign of Republican nominee John McCain, writing:

In an August 2012 Spreecast interview, Alonso stated her opposition to Obama's re-election, saying that if reelected, he would take steps to make the United States become more like Venezuela under the Chávez government.

In January 2014, Alonso resigned from a San Francisco production of The Vagina Monologues after appearing in an advertisement for Republican candidate for Governor Tim Donnelly.

On September 17, 2014, Venezuelan President Nicolás Maduro asked Interior Minister Miguel Rodríguez Torres to pursue legal actions to revoke Alonso's Venezuelan citizenship. The reason was her public request on a radio interview for a military intervention against Venezuela: "In my opinion, (the US) must intervene, because the Cubans already invaded without firing a single bullet because they gave it (Venezuela) for free. So I would like that the US would invade using bullets to get all those communists out of Venezuela".

In mid-2016, Alonso stated that she supported neither Republican Presidential candidate Donald Trump nor Democratic Presidential candidate Hillary Clinton in the U.S. election, viewing both of them as unacceptable. She ended up supporting Gary Johnson in the general election.

Filmography 
{| class="wikitable sortable"
|-
! Year !! Film !! Role !! class="unsortable" | Notes
|-
| 1978
| Savana – Sesso e diamanti
| Margaret Johnson
| Italian B movie
|-
|rowspan="3"|1979
| Solon
|
|
|-
| Estefanía
| Silvana Cataldo
| rowspan="9" | TV series
|-
| Mabel Valdez, periodista
|
|-
| 1980
| Natalia de 8 a 9
| Mariana Brito
|-
| 1980
| Mi hijo Gabriel
|
|-
| 1980
| El Esposo de Anaís
|
|-
| 1980
| Claudia
| Claudia
|-
| 1981
| Marielena
|Marielena
|-
| 1981
| Angelito
|
|-
| 1981
| Luz Marina
| Luz Marina
|-
| 1982
| Fantasy Island
| French Girl
| 1 episode
|-
| 1982
| Knight Rider
| Marie Elena Casafranca
| 1 episode; credited as Maria Conchita
|-
| 1983
| Nacho
| Herself
| TV series
|-
| 1984
| Moscow on the Hudson
| Lucia Lombardo
|
|-
| 1984
| Fear City
| Silver
| as Maria Conchita
|-
| 1986
| A Fine Mess
| Claudia Pazzo
| a.k.a. Blake Edwards''' A Fine Mess (USA: complete title)
|-
| 1986
| Touch and Go| Denise DeLeon
|
|-
| 1987
| Il cugino americano| Caterina Ammirati
| a.k.a. Blood Ties (USA: TV title)
|-
| 1987
| Extreme Prejudice| Sarita Cisneros
|
|-
| 1987
| The Running Man| Amber Mendez
|
|-
| 1988
| Con el Corazón en la Mano|
|
|-
| 1988
| Colors| Louisa Gomez
|
|-
| 1989
| One of the Boys| Maria Conchita Navarro
| 6 episodes
|-
| 1989
| Vampire's Kiss| Alva Restrepo
|
|-
| 1990
| Predator 2| Leona Cantrell
|
|-
| 1991
| Cuerpos clandestinos (TV)
| Claudia
|
|-
| 1991
| McBain| Christina
|
|-
| 1992
| Teamster Boss: The Jackie Presser Story (TV)
| Carmen
| a.k.a. Power Play: The Jackie Presser Story (UK: video title)
|-
| 1993
| Roosters| Chata
|
|-
| 1993
| The House of the Spirits| Tránsito Soto
|
|-
| 1994
| Alejandra| Alejandra Martínez
| TV series 
|-
| 1994
| Texas (TV)
| Lucia
| a.k.a. James A. Michener's Texas|-
| 1994
| MacShayne: The Final Roll of the Dice (TV)
| Cindy Evans
|
|-
| 1996
| Caught| Betty
| a.k.a. Atrapados (USA: Spanish title)
|-
| 1996
| For Which He Stands| Theresa Rochetti
|
|-
| 1996
| Sudden Terror: The Hijacking of School Bus #17| Marta Caldwell
|
|-
| 1997
| Women: Stories of Passion| Sophia
| 1 episode
|-
| 1997
| Chicago Hope| Emma Scull
| 2 episodes
|-
| 1997
| Robert Altman's Gun| Marti
| 1 episode
|-
| 1997
| Catherine's Grove| Charley Vasquez
|
|-
| 1997
| F/X: The Series| Elena Serrano
| 2 episodes
|-
| 1997
| Acts of Betrayal| Eva Ramirez
|
|-
| 1998
| Exposé| Nancy Drake
| a.k.a. Footsteps (Philippines: English title) (USA: working title)
|-
| 1998
| Blackheart| Annette
|
|-
| 1998
| The Nanny| Concepcion Sheffield
| 1 episode
|-
| 1998
| The Outer Limits| Marie Alexander
| Episode: "The Vaccine"
|-
| 1998
| El Grito en el cielo| Miranda Vega
| a.k.a. Shout Out (USA: festival title)
|-
| 1998
| My Husband's Secret Life (TV)
| Toni Diaz
|
|-
| 1999
| Touched by an Angel| Dr. Sandra Pena
| 1 episode
|-
| 1999
| Dillinger in Paradise| Lola
|
|-
| 2000
| Chain of Command| Vice President Gloria Valdez
|
|-
|2000
|Amantes de luna llena
|
|
|-
| 2000
| Knockout| Carmen Alvarado
|
|-
| 2000
| A Vision of Murder: The Story of Donielle (TV)
| Gloria
|
|-
| 2000
| Best Actress (TV)
| Maria Katarina Caldone
|
|-
| 2000
| High Noon (TV)
| Helen Ramirez
|
|-
| 2000
| Twice in a Lifetime| Kat Lopez
| 1 episode
|-
| 2000
| The Princess & the Barrio Boy (TV)
| Minerva Rojas
| a.k.a. She's in Love (UK)
|-
| 2001
| The Code conspiracy| Rachel
|
|-
| 2001
| Resurrection Blvd.| Julia Hernandez
| 3 episodes
|-
| 2001
| Birth of Babylon| Lupe Velez
|
|-
| 2002
| Blind Heat| Adrianna Scott
|
|-
| 2002
| Robbery Homicide Division| Claudia
| 1 episode
|-
| 2003
| The Company You Keep| Vera
|
|-
| 2003
| Kingpin| Ariela
| TV series
|-
| 2003
| Heart of America| Mrs. Jones
| a.k.a. Home Room (Australia)
|-
| 2003
| Chasing Papi| Maria
|
|-
| 2003
| Newton's Law|
|
|-
| 2004
| CSI: Miami| Marisela Gonzalez
| 1 episode: Blood Moon
|-
| 2005
| English as a Second Language| Consuelo Sara
|
|-
| 2005
| La Academia USA| Judge
|
|-
| 2005
| Smoke| Aurora Avila
|
|-
| 2006
| Desperate Housewives| Lucía Márquez
| 1 episode
|-
| 2006
| Material Girls| Inez
|
|-
| 2007
| The Dead One| Sister Rosa
|
|-
| 2007
| The Condor (V)
| Mrs. Valdez (voice)
| a.k.a. Stan Lee Presents: The Condor (USA: DVD box title)
|-
| 2007
| Saints & Sinners| Diana Martin
| 62 episodes
|-
| 2008
| Richard III| Queen Elizabeth
|
|-
| 2008
| Tranced| Libra
|
|-
| 2008
| The Art of Travel| Mrs. Layne
|
|-
| 2008
| The Red Canvas| Maria Sanchez
|
|-
| 2008
| Two Minutes Of Hate 
|
| Dos minutos de odio|-
| 2008
| Unauthorized Clifford 
|
| Des-Autorizado (Venezuela: wide-release title)
|-
| 2009
| Maneater (miniseries)
| Alejandra Alpert
| Two episodes
|-
| 2009
| Dark Moon Rising| Sheriff Sam.
| 
|-
| 2009
| Spread| Ingrid
|
|-
| 2011
| Without Men| Lucrecia
|
|-
| 2012
| Lords of Salem| Alice Matthias
|
|-
| 2014
| Return to Babylon| Lupe Vélez
|
|-
| 2016
| November Rule| Ms Luisa 
|
|-
|2017
|Kill 'Em All|Agent Sanders
|
|-
| 2018
| Off the Menu| Cordelia Torres
| 
|-
| 2018
| El señor de los cielos| Nora Requena
|
|-
| 2019
| ¡He matado a mi marido!| Remedios
|
|-
| 2019
| The I-Land| Mrs. Chase
| Miniseries
|-
| 2019
|Into the Dark|Bea
|1 episode ("Good Boy") 
|-
|2021
|Take Me to Tarzana||Juanita||
|}

 Discography 
 Love Maniac (Polydor/PolyGram, 1979)
 The Witch (Polydor/Polygram, 1980)
 Dangerous Rhythm (PolyGram, 1982)
 Te Amo (Polydor/PolyGram, 1983)
 María Conchita (A&M/PolyGram, 1984; first Grammy nomination)
 O Ella o Yo (A&M/PolyGram, 1985)
 Grandes Éxitos (PolyGram, 1986)
 Mírame (PolyGram, 1987)
 Hazme Sentir (PolyGram, 1990)
 Otra Mentira Mas (second Grammy nomination)
 En Vivo México (Capitol/EMI Mexico, 1991)
 Imagíname (Columbia/SME Mexico, 1992; third Grammy nomination)
 Alejandra: Boleros (PolyGram, 1994)
 Hoy y Siempre (PolyGram, 1997)
 Grandes Éxitos (2004)
 Soy EP (Hypnotic, 2005)
 Greatest Hits (Universal Latino, 2008)
 Mienteme (Universal Latino, 2009)
 Amor De Madrugada'' (ARDC Music Division, 2016)

Singles

References

External links

 
 
 
 María Conchita Alonso at Discogs

1957 births
Living people
A&M Records artists
American anti-communists
American beauty pageant winners
American entertainers of Cuban descent
American people of Asturian descent
California Republicans
Columbia Records artists
Cuban anti-communists
Cuban emigrants to Venezuela
Exiles of the Cuban Revolution in the United States
Hispanic and Latino American actresses
La Academia judges
Venezuelan LGBT rights activists
Miss World 1975 delegates
Opposition to Fidel Castro
OTI Festival presenters
People from Cienfuegos
Polydor Records artists
Venezuelan anti-communists
Venezuelan emigrants to the United States
20th-century Venezuelan women singers
Venezuelan film actresses
Venezuelan musical theatre actresses
Venezuelan television actresses
20th-century American actresses
21st-century American actresses
20th-century American women singers
20th-century American singers
21st-century American women singers
21st-century American singers
20th-century Venezuelan actresses
21st-century Venezuelan actresses
Women in Latin music
Latino conservatism in the United States